Čeladná is a spa municipality and village in the Frýdek-Místek District in the Moravian-Silesian Region of the Czech Republic. It has about 2,800 inhabitants.

Geography

The municipality lies in the Moravian-Silesian Beskids mountain range in the valley of the Čeladenka stream.

History
The first written mention of Čeladná is from 1581.

The spa and rehabilitation centre were founded here in 1902. From the 1950s to 2000, the activity of the spa was suspended and there was a hospital and a famous maternity hospital on the premises, therefore Čeladná is the birthplace of many personalities.

Economy
Čeladná is known for its spa and rehabilitation centre. It is the main employer in the municipality.

In the 21st century Čeladná has become a popular holiday resort with new hotels and infrastructure.

Sport
Čeladná is renowned for the largest golf course in the Czech Republic.

Notable people
Miroslava Jaškovská (born 1955), cross-country skier
Ivo Valenta (born 1956), businessman and politician
Iveta Bartošová (1966–2014), singer
Ondřej Kratěna (born 1977), ice hockey player
Pavel Kubina (born 1977), ice hockey player
Jakub Janda (born 1978), ski jumper and politician
Jan Mazoch (born 1985), ski jumper

References

External links

Villages in Frýdek-Místek District
Spa towns in the Czech Republic